Sabine Klamroth (born August 10, 1933 in Halberstadt) is a German lawyer and author. Sabine Klamroth studied languages and law in Heidelberg, Berlin and Munich. She worked for a long time as a lawyer in Heidelberg and served as the editor-in-chief of various legal journals. Her famous book "Erst wenn der Mond bei Seckbachs steht"(Only when the moon is at Seckbachs) was destroyed during the Third Reich but published and internationally recognized in 2006.

References

Living people
1933 births
German women lawyers
20th-century German lawyers
People from Halberstadt
Academic journal editors
20th-century German writers
20th-century German women writers
20th-century women lawyers